Melanoides admirabilis is a species of freshwater snail with a gill and an operculum, an aquatic gastropod mollusk in the family Thiaridae.

This species is found in the Democratic Republic of the Congo, Tanzania, and Zambia. Its natural habitat is freshwater lakes.

References

Thiaridae
Taxa named by Edgar Albert Smith
Gastropods described in 1880
Taxonomy articles created by Polbot